Bozyaka is a proposed underground station on the Üçyol—Çamlıkule Line of the İzmir Metro. It will be located beneath Ali Rıza Avni Boulevard in northern Karabağlar. Construction of the station, along with the metro line, is expected to begin in 2020. The station will be constructed on the southern part of a loop, that will split west of General Asım Gündüz station and connect at Üçyol. Zafertepe station will be the counterpart to Bozyaka, on the northern section of the loop.

Zafertepe station is expected to open in 2024.

References

İzmir Metro
Railway stations scheduled to open in 2024
Rapid transit stations under construction in Turkey